Back in Business may refer to:
Back in Business (1997 film), an action film starring Brian Bosworth
Back in Business (EPMD album), 1997
Back in Business (Eartha Kitt album), 1994
"Back in Business", a song by AC/DC from their 1985 album Fly on the Wall
Back in Business (Desperate Housewives), an episode of the TV series Desperate Housewives